Wennerstrom or Wennerström may refer to:

 Wennerstrom (surname)
 Hans-Erik Wennerström, fictional character in novel The Girl with the Dragon Tattoo